On Tour is a five song EP by Canadian singer, Luba. It was released in 1990, a year later after her album All or Nothing, featuring four tracks, recorded life during the All Or Nothing tour, and a fifth one, an acoustic version of her single "Let It Go".

Track listing
 Wild Heart (Live)  – 5:00
 Bringing It All Back Home (Live) - 4:55
 Everytime I See Your Picture (Live)  – 4:05
 When A Man Loves A Woman (Live)  – 4:15
 Let It Go (Acoustic Version)  – 4:00

External links
 Official Luba Website
 Luba at canoe.ca
 Luba on MySpace

1990 EPs
Luba (singer) albums